Aratkənd or Aratkend may refer to:
Birinci Aratkənd, Azerbaijan
İkinci Aratkənd, Azerbaijan